Edgar Suter Bacon (April 8, 1895 – October 2, 1963) was an American Major League Baseball pitcher. He played for the Philadelphia Athletics during the  season.

References

Major League Baseball pitchers
Philadelphia Athletics players
Baseball players from Kentucky
People from Frankfort, Kentucky
1895 births
1963 deaths
Frankfort Old Taylors players
Columbus Senators players
Chattanooga Lookouts players
Waco Navigators players
Columbia Comers players
Richmond Colts players
Lexington Reds players
Laurel Blue Hens players
Petersburg Trunkmakers players